The Palace of the Inquisition, also known as the Inquisition Palace, is an eighteenth-century the seat of the Holy Office of the Inquisition in Cartagena, now in modern Colombia. Completed in 1770, it currently serves as a museum showcasing historical artifacts. Among the many historical artifacts, the museum displays torture equipment used on victims during the inquisition. These items were removed from display in 2015 prior to visits to Colombia by Pope Francis. They have since partially returned and are again on display. The museum has been described as "one of the finer buildings" in Cartagena. Cited as one of Cartagena's "best examples of late colonial, civil architecture", it faces the Parque de Bolívar.

History
The establishment of the Palace was decreed by Philip III of Spain. Since Cartagena was a center of commerce, a transit point between the Caribbean and Spanish settlements in western South America, the city became the third in the Spanish empire to have a tribunal of the Holy Office of the Inquisition. Some merchants were Portuguese and suspected of being crypto-Jews (Jews passing as Christian). During the period 1580–1640, the crown of Portugal and that of Spain were ruled by the same monarch, and the period saw many Portuguese merchants active in Spain's overseas colonies. Established in 1610, the current building was completed much later. The Palace was used by Inquisition to try Jews and other non-Catholics and about 800 individuals believed guilty of crimes such as black magic were publicly executed there.

Architecture

The Palace is built in Spanish Colonial style, with elements from the Baroque era. A crucifix occupies one of the walls facing a torture equipment. The white brick structure has gateways made of stone. The rooms of the Palace are mostly made up of masonry. The framework of the Palace is built out of wood; double-storey limestones were also used in the making of the Palace. The museum displays coins, maps, weapons, furniture, church bells, and depictions of notable generals, in addition to the torture equipment used previously. The Palace was partially restored to preserve Colombia's cultural heritage.

See also
List of colonial buildings in Cartagena, Colombia
 Mexican Inquisition
 Peruvian Inquisition
 Architecture of Colombia

Notes

References

Museums in Colombia
Palaces in Colombia
Houses completed in 1770
Tourist attractions in Cartagena, Colombia
Buildings and structures in Cartagena, Colombia
Spanish Colonial architecture in Colombia
1770 establishments in the Spanish Empire